(formerly Aster mollis) is a species of flowering plant in the aster family (Asteraceae) endemic to the Bighorn Mountains of Montana and Wyoming in the United States.

Description
Symphyotrichum molle is a perennial, herbaceous plant which blooms in August. It has from one to five stems, sometimes more, that are densely covered in soft, downy hairs, sometimes to the extent of being woolly. The stems arise from the root base in an ascending or erect fashion.

Leaves
The leaves are thin and covered in downy to woolly hairs on both sides. They are smooth around the edges and pointed at the ends. By the time the plant blooms, the basal leaves usually have withered or dried. They may or may not have a petiole, and they are oblanceolate in shape. They slightly clasp the stem.

Flowers
Each head has a hairy peduncle with 0–3 bracts which are either lanceolate to narrowly ovate in shape.

There are usually  yellow disk florets with triangular lobes when they bloom.

Chromosomes
Symphyotrichum molle has a base number of eight chromosomes  with a tetraploid count of 32.

Distribution and habitat
Symphyotrichum molle is endemic to the Bighorn Mountains of Montana and Wyoming in the United States.

Conservation
NatureServe lists Symphyotrichum molle as Vulnerable (G3) worldwide, Imperiled (S2) in Montana, and Vulnerable (S3) in Wyoming.

Citations

References

molle
Endemic flora of the United States
Flora of Montana
Flora of Wyoming
Plants described in 1901
Taxa named by Per Axel Rydberg